Monza may refer to:

 Monza, a city in Lombardy, Italy
 Autodromo Nazionale di Monza, the city's racing circuit
 A.C. Monza, the city's football team
 Carlo Ignazio Monza (died 1739), Italian composer
 Monza (band), a Belgian band
 Monza (skipper), a genus of grass skipper butterflies

Automobiles
 Alfa Romeo Monza
 Chevrolet:
 Chevrolet Monza, a North American 2-door car (H-body) (1975–1980)
 Chevrolet Corvair Monza, an upscale, sporty trim line for the Corvair (1960–1969)
 Chevrolet Corvair Monza GT and Monza SS, a concept/prototype sports coupe (1962) and convertible (1963)
 Chevrolet Monza, a Brazilian hatchback and sedan (based on the Opel Ascona) (1982–1996)
 Chevrolet Chevy Monza, a Mexican sedan (based on the Opel Corsa) (1994–2004)
 Chevrolet Monza, a Chinese sedan (GM-PATAC K platform) (based on the Buick Excelle GT) (2019–present)
 DKW Monza
 Ferrari:
 Ferrari Monza, a series of racing cars (1953–1957)
 Ferrari Monza SP, a limited production series of sports cars (2019)
 Opel Monza